Waibakul is a town in East Nusa Tenggara province of Indonesia and it is the seat (capital) of Central Sumba Regency.

Populated places in East Nusa Tenggara
Regency seats of East Nusa Tenggara
Geography of Sumba